Guy Marcel Roux (born 18 October 1938) is a French former football player and manager known for being in charge of AJ Auxerre for more than 40 years and for leading the team to national and worldwide prominence.

Managerial career
A native of Colmar, Roux played for AJ Auxerre between 1954 and 1957 and became player-manager of the then Division d'Honneur (fourth level) club in 1961 to become its living legend and symbol. In 1970 Auxerre got promoted to the Division 3 League, and Roux retired as a player. In 1974 Auxerre got promoted again, this time to Division 2. With Roux in charge the team made it to a Coupe de France final in 1979 and progressed to Division 1 in 1980. The team then went further to clinch the Division 1 title in 1995–96 and win the Coupe de France four times (1993–94, 1995–96, 2002–03, 2004–05). Among AJ Auxerre's honours under Roux are also an Intertoto Cup triumph and the 1992–93 UEFA Cup semi-final. Roux retired in 2000, but returned the next year.

Roux believed that a strong infrastructure was paramount to long-term success. In 1980, Roux rejected the chance to sign French international striker Olivier Rouyer in favour of opening a state-of-the-art youth academy. During his period at the helm, the team established itself as a powerhouse in French football and became known worldwide as an academy for top players, since it was the club where football stars such as Eric Cantona, Basile Boli, Alain Goma, Frédéric Darras, Pascal Vahirua, Raphael Guerreiro, Stéphane Mazzolini, Djibril Cissé, Philippe Mexès and Teemu Tainio won themselves a name being spotted and their talent further developed by Roux. He also helped rebuild the careers of players, such as Laurent Blanc and Enzo Scifo, after they had experienced poor spells.

In 2000, Roux was a recipient of the UEFA President's Award which recognises outstanding achievements, professional excellence and exemplary personal qualities. 

Roux retired from managing Auxerre in June 2005 to be replaced by Jacques Santini. At the end of his career as Auxerre manager, Roux led Auxerre through about 2,000 games, including a European record of 890 top-flight league matches.

He briefly came out of retirement in June 2007 when he signed a two-year contract with RC Lens. However, he resigned on 25 August 2007 during a 2–1 defeat at Strasbourg after only four matches without a win at the helm.

Honours

Auxerre
Division 1: 1995–96
Coupe de France: 1993–94, 1995–96, 2002–03, 2004–05
Division 2: 1979–80
Division d'Honneur de Bourgogne: 1969–70
UEFA Intertoto Cup: 1997
Coppa delle Alpi: 1985, 1987

Individual
Ligue 1 Manager of the Year: 1995–96
UEFA President's Award: 2000

Orders
Chevalier of the Légion d'honneur: 1999
Officier of the Légion d'honneur: 2008

See also
 List of longest managerial reigns in association football

References

External links

General

1938 births
Living people
Sportspeople from Colmar
Footballers from Alsace
French footballers
Association football midfielders
AJ Auxerre players
Stade Poitevin FC players
Limoges FC players
French football managers
AJ Auxerre managers
RC Lens managers
Ligue 1 managers
Chevaliers of the Légion d'honneur
Officiers of the Légion d'honneur
Association football player-managers